Backbooth is a live acoustic album by American post-grunge band Seven Mary Three.  It was released on February 9, 2010, on Settle Up.

Track listing

"Untitled" – 3:30
"Last Kiss" – 4:01
"Oceans of Envy" – 3:31
"Wait" – 3:07
"Laughing Out Loud" – 3:30
"Dreaming Against Me" – 3:07
"Home Stretch" – 3:28
"Dead Days In the Kitchen" – 3:40
"She Wants Results" – 4:21
"Flagship Eleanor" – 2:49
"Upside Down" – 4:22
"Hammer & a Stone" – 4:43
"Each Little Mystery" – 3:13
"Southwestern State" – 5:50
"Lucky" – 4:12
"That's How Strong My Love Is" – 3:05
"Walk With the Devil" – 4:40

Album credits
 Jason Ross – lead vocals, rhythm guitar
 Thomas Juliano – lead guitar, backing vocals
 Casey Daniel – bass
 Mike Levesque – drums
 Aaron Lee Tasjan - keyboards
 Steven Foxbury - backing vocals

References

2010 albums
Seven Mary Three albums